Élie Cester (27 July 1942 - 3 January 2017) was a French rugby union player who played at lock for the France national rugby union team.

Early life and career 
Élie Cester was born on July 27, 1942, in L'Isle-Jourdain, France. 

Cester earned his first cap for the France national rugby union team on January 15, 1966.   

He made a total of 35 official appearances for the French national team between 1966 and 1974. He captained the team on three occasions.  

Roques was part of the French national team that won the Five Nations Championship in 1967, 1968, 1970 (tied with Wales) and 1973.

Death 
Cester died at the age of 74 in Bourg-les-Valence, France, on January 3, 2017.

See also 

 France national rugby union team

References 

French rugby union players
Rugby union locks
Living people

1942 births
France international rugby union players
Sportspeople from Gers